3-Fluoroamphetamine (3-FA; PAL-353) is a stimulant drug from the amphetamine family which acts as a monoamine releaser with similar potency to methamphetamine but more selectivity for dopamine and norepinephrine release over serotonin. It is self-administered by mice to a similar extent to related drugs such as 4-fluoroamphetamine and 3-methylamphetamine.

Legal status

China
As of October 2015 3-FA is a controlled substance in China.

See also 
 2-Fluoroamphetamine (2-FA)
 3-Fluoroethamphetamine (3-FEA)
 3-Fluoromethamphetamine (3-FMA)
 3-Hydroxyamphetamine (Gepefrine)
 3-Methylamphetamine (3-MA)
 3-Methoxyamphetamine (3-MeOA)
 3-Trifluoromethylamphetamine (Norfenfluramine)
 4-Fluoroamphetamine (4-FA)

References 

Substituted amphetamines
Fluoroarenes
Designer drugs
Norepinephrine-dopamine releasing agents